Acongeong or  Acumcum) is a town in the state of Western Bahr el Ghazal in northwestern South Sudan. It is located northeast of the city of Wau.

During the Second Sudanese Civil War,  UNICEF had a camp in Acumcum to treat malnourished children. Other organizations such as MSF and the World Food Programme of the United Nations were present in Acumcum.

External links
Map of southern Sudan (Acongeong towards bottom left) 

Populated places in Western Bahr el Ghazal
Bahr el Ghazal